John Nichol (8 September 1833 – 11 October 1894), was a Scottish literary academic, and the first Regius Professor of English Language and Literature at the University of Glasgow.

Early life
Born in Montrose, Scotland, Nichol was the son of John Pringle Nichol, Regius Professor of Astronomy at the University of Glasgow. John Jr. studied first at Glasgow (1848–55) and then Balliol College, Oxford (1855–9) as a Snell Exhibitioner, graduating with a First-Class degree in Classics, Philosophy and Mathematics. After graduating, Nicholl remained at Oxford as a coach. With Albert Venn Dicey, Thomas Hill Green, Swinburne and others, he formed the Old Mortality Society for discussions on literary matters.

Glasgow
In 1862 he was made Regius Professor of English Literature at Glasgow. He had already made a reputation as an acute critic and a successful lecturer, and his influence at Glasgow was very marked. During his tenure as Regius Professor, he also lectured at Oxford University as well as private tutoring across Britain, and formed a strong reputation as an inspiring lecturer, later joining Glasgow's Dialectic Society.

He left Glasgow for London in 1889, and died on 11 October 1894. A Memoir by Professor Knight was published in 1896.

Works
Among the major works by Nichol were his drama Hannibal (1873), The Death of Themistocles, and other Poems (1881), his Byron in the "English Men of Letters" series (1880), his Robert Burns (1882) and Carlyle (1892).

Nichol was also an enthusiastic Americanist and wrote the ground-breaking American Literature: An Historical Review, 1620–1880 (1882). He visited the United States in 1865, and in 1882 he wrote the article on American literature for the ninth edition of the Encyclopædia Britannica.

In addition to the above, he was also the author of the following works:

Fragments of Criticism, a volume of essays, (1860); 
Tables of European Literature and History, A.D. 200-1876 (1876);
Tables of Ancient Literature and History, (1877);
English Composition, a literature primer, (1879); 
Questions on English Composition, (1890); and 
two volumes on Lord Bacon's Life and Philosophy for Black's "Series of Philosophical Writers", (1887–89).

Nichol also wrote essays for the Westminster Review, North British Review, and other reviews; articles in the Encyclopædia Britannica; and several pamphlets on education questions.

Nichol was long blamed by biographers of the poet Swinburne for leading Swinburne to lose his faith and to alcoholism.  Neither charge is true (See Terry L. Meyers, "On Drink and Faith:  Swinburne and John Nichol at Oxford". Review of English Studies, ns 55:220 (June 2004), 392–424).

References

External links 

 
 
 His article about American Literature (in Encyclopædia Britannica 9th ed.)

1833 births
1894 deaths
Scottish biographers
People from Montrose, Angus
Academics of the University of Glasgow
Alumni of the University of Glasgow
Alumni of Balliol College, Oxford